Profu' is a Romanian dramedy TV show that started airing September 10, 2019 on Pro TV. The show is loosely based on RTL's Der Lehrer and stars Andi Vasluianu as Mihai "Mișu" Iacob, the teacher of physics, physical education and chemistry at the Industrial High School "Emil Gârleanu" in Bucharest. The soundtrack of the series is provided by HaHaHa Production and the sponsors of the series are Coca-Cola and KFC.

In 2020, Pro TV renewed Profu' for a second season.

Premise
Mihai Iacob, the favorite teacher of the students from the "Emil Gârleanu" Industrial High School in the capital, goes through a lot of funny and less funny experiences when Ms. Ana Casian comes to the high school to teach Romanian language and literature. A complicated relationship takes place between the two. It becomes even more complicated when their students come to play a very important role in their lives as well.

Cast and characters

Episodes

Season 1 (2019)

Season 2 (2021)

References

Romanian drama television series
Romanian comedy television series
Romanian television series
Romanian-language television shows
Television series about educators
2019 Romanian television series debuts
Pro TV original programming